Sir Thomas Slingsby, 2nd Baronet (15 June 1636 – 1 March 1688), of Scriven in Yorkshire, was an English landowner and Member of Parliament.

He was the second but oldest surviving son of Sir Henry Slingsby, executed in 1658 for his adherence to the Royalist cause during the English Civil War. The family estates were confiscated, but were restored following the Restoration in 1660.

He was High Sheriff of Yorkshire in 1660 and entered Parliament in 1670 as member for Yorkshire, and subsequently also represented Knaresborough (the family borough) and Scarborough.

In 1658 he married Dorothy Cradock (d. 1673), daughter of George Cradock of Caverswall Castle, and they had three children:
 Sir Henry Slingsby, 3rd Baronet (c. 1660 – 1691), his heir, also MP for Knaresborough, who died unmarried
 Sir Thomas Slingsby, 4th Baronet (c. 1668 – 1726), who succeeded his brother
 Barbara, Countess of Pembroke (d. 1722), who married three times  – to Sir Richard Mauliverer of Allerton Mauliverer (d. 1689), to The Lord Arundell of Trerice (1649–1698), and to The Earl of Pembroke (1656–1733).

References
 
 Slingsby genealogy

|-

Slingsby, Thomas
Slingsby, Thomas
Slingsby, Thomas, 2nd Baronet
High Sheriffs of Yorkshire
English landowners
English MPs 1661–1679
English MPs 1679
English MPs 1680–1681
English MPs 1681
English MPs 1685–1687